Andreas Raelert (born 11 August 1976) is a German triathlete. His younger brother, Michael Raelert, is also a triathlete.

On 10 July 2011, Raelert broke the world record time for an Ironman Triathlon distance race at the Challenge Roth event in Roth, Germany. Finishing in a time of 7 hours, 41 minutes and 33 seconds, he beat Marino Vanhoenacker's record time of 7:45:58 set just a week before. However, since Raelert’s time was not at an official Ironman event, Vanhoenacker’s time remains the fastest at an Ironman-sanctioned event.

Raelert competed in the first Olympic triathlon event at the 2000 Sydney Olympics. He took twelfth place with a total time of 1:49:31.28. He competed again four years later, at the 2004 Athens Olympics. This time, he achieved sixth place with a time of 1:52:35.62 on the more difficult course.

In 2008, Raelert won the silver at the 2008 70.3 Ironman World Championships.

Raelert finished 2nd in the 2010, 2012 and 2015 Ironman World Championships. He also collected a 3rd-place finish at the 2011 Championship event.

Notes

External links 
 

German male triathletes
Triathletes at the 2000 Summer Olympics
Triathletes at the 2004 Summer Olympics
1976 births
Living people
Olympic triathletes of Germany
People from Bezirk Rostock
Sportspeople from Rostock